Gregory Sylvester Mangin (November 1, 1907 – October 27, 1979) was an American tennis player and Wall Street broker. He won four U.S. Indoor singles titles in the 1930s.

Early life and education

Mangin was born in  Newark, New Jersey. All four of his grandparents were born in Ireland. 

He was educated at Georgetown University and learned lawn tennis in Montclair, New Jersey.

Tennis career 
In 1931, Mangin and Berkeley Bell were runners-up in the doubles final of the U.S. National Championships in Brookline, Mass., losing in straight sets to compatriots John Van Ryn and Wilmer Allison.

Mangin won the singles title at the U.S. Indoor Championships, held at the Seventh Regiment Armory in New York, in 1932, 1933, 1935 and 1936. He was a member of the US Davis Cup teams in 1930 and 1931 but did not play any matches.

Military service 
During WWII Mangin enlisted in the United States Army Air Forces (AAF). He became a tail gunner on the B-17 Flying Fortress and flew 50 missions over Europe. He was wounded twice in missions over Italy and France, and shot down two Bf 109s in a mission over Germany. Reaching the rank of staff sergeant, he received the Distinguished Flying Cross (DFC), the Air Medal with six clusters, and a Purple Heart with one cluster.

Grand Slam finals

Doubles (1 runner-up)

References

1907 births
1979 deaths
American male tennis players
Sportspeople from Newark, New Jersey
Tennis people from New Jersey
American people of Irish descent
American financial traders